Judge Barnes may refer to:

David L. Barnes (1760–1812), judge of the United States District Court for the District of Rhode Island
Harry F. Barnes (1932–2019), judge of the United States District Court for the Western District of Arkansas
John P. Barnes (1881–1959), judge of the United States District Court for the Northern District of Illinois
Stanley Barnes (1900–1990), judge of the United States Court of Appeals for the Ninth Circuit

See also
Justice Barnes (disambiguation)